Accountability Act may refer to a number of different pieces of legislation:

Canada
Federal Accountability Act

United States
Syria Accountability Act
Darfur Peace and Accountability Act
Health Insurance Portability and Accountability Act
Public Schools Accountability Act of California